Miguel Pacios (born March 10, 1977 in Lormont) is a French professional football player. Currently, he plays in the Championnat National for Rodez AF.

He played on the professional level in Ligue 2 for AS Cannes.

See also
Football in France
List of football clubs in France

References

1977 births
Living people
French footballers
Ligue 2 players
FC Libourne players
AS Cannes players
Rodez AF players
Association football forwards